James Twining (born 13 December 1972) is a British thriller writer.

Life 
Although born in London, Twining spent most of his childhood in France after his family moved to Paris when he was four. On his return to the United Kingdom when aged eleven, he went to Merchant Taylors' School, eventually winning a place to Christ Church, Oxford where he read French Literature and Linguistics and graduated with a First Class degree in 1995.

Twining's early career was spent in the business world.  His first job was in the Corporate Finance Department of SBC Warburg (now known as UBS), where he worked mainly on hostile bids and defences and leveraged buyouts.

Then in 1999 he set up an e-procurement business (GroupTrade) with a friend. The business was eventually sold to another entrepreneur in August 2002. Twining and his co-founder were both named as one of the eight "Best of Young British" entrepreneurs in The New Statesman.

Twining began writing thrillers in 2003.  He now lives in North London with his wife, two daughters and a son and is a lifelong Arsenal fan.

Work

Twining wrote his first book The Double Eagle in 2003 and was signed up by agency Curtis Brown.  It was published by Harper Collins in the United Kingdom and United States in 2005.

Three sequels, The Black Sun, The Gilded Seal and The Geneva Deception were published in 2006, 2008 and 2009 respectively.

All four books feature art thief Tom Kirk and are set in the art world and underworld.  In each case, Twining builds a modern-day thriller involving art theft around a series of historical events and/or artifacts.

In 2009 Twining announced on his website that he was working on the fifth Tom Kirk novel. As of yet there have been no further updates on this, and his website has not been updated since 2010

References

External links
Official James Twining website

McKinsey & Company people
1972 births
Living people
People educated at Merchant Taylors' School, Northwood
English thriller writers
English crime fiction writers
English male novelists